The A515 Skeoge Link is a road in Northern Ireland which was designed to complete the route between Foyle Bridge in County Londonderry and Donegal. It is part of a larger project to link County Donegal with Belfast. The total construction cost was £5 million.

Construction
Skeoge Link Road is a road scheme that was constructed along the northwestern periphery of Derry. This road had been called for going back as far as the 1980s to relieve traffic from the already congested Buncrana Road which is the A2 and other roads within the Galliagh and Steelstown Area. It was reported in February 2008 in the Derry Journal that the scheme is set to open in March of the same year. The road opened to traffic on 20 March 2020.

References

515
Proposed roads in the United Kingdom
Roads in County Londonderry
Proposed transport infrastructure in Northern Ireland